Osten Transporter Bridge is an  long transporter bridge over the Oste River in Osten (Oste), Lower Saxony, Germany. It was built in 1908-9 and was in regular use until 1974 and is now only used as a tourist attraction.
The bridge can transport 6 cars or 100 persons simultaneously.

External links
 
 http://www.schwebefaehre.org/
 

Road bridges in Germany
Transporter bridges
Bridges completed in 1909
Buildings and structures in Cuxhaven (district)